Mere Sanam (English: My Lover ) is a 1965 Hindi film starring Biswajeet, Asha Parekh, Mumtaz, Pran and Rajendra Nath. The film was a hit at the box office, especially because of the musical score by Majrooh Sultanpuri, O. P. Nayyar and the Asha Bhosle - Mohammed Rafi collaboration. The film was shot in the beautiful locales of Kashmir just before the outbreak of Indo-Pakistani war of 1965.

The Songs "Jaiye Aap Kahan Jayenge", "Yeh Hai Reshmi Zulfon Ka Andhera", "Pukarta Chala Hoon Main" and "Humdum Mere Maan Bhi Jao" are milestones in Hindi film music.

This film is the unofficial remake of Come September, which is a 1961 romantic comedy film directed by Robert Mulligan, starring Rock Hudson, Gina Lollobrigida, Sandra Dee and Bobby Darin.

Story 
Neena (Asha Parekh) is on an excursion trip to Kashmir, in the company of her mother Savitri Devi (Achala Sachdev), who is also the warden of their girls hostel in Lucknow and several female friends. During their journey, they decide to stay overnight at the Dreamland Hotel. Another lodger, Kumar (Biswajit Chatterjee), who arrives there subsequently, finds their presence undesirable and asks the caretaker to get the surprised group to leave, as he is perturbed by the fact that his residential bungalow has been converted into the Dreamland Hotel! The caretaker, Shyam (Pran) explains to the girls that Kumar is mentally unstable and under the impression that he is the owner of the hotel, as Shyam is involved in illegal activities there, for which he had converted the bungalow into a vice den.

Kumar is the heir apparent to his uncle, Mr. Mehra's (Nazir Hussain) industrial empire and cotton mills as his father and Mr. Mehra were the best of friends. Mr. Mehra had relocated to Africa for business, leaving his two-year-old daughter and his wife in her paternal home, subsequent to which came Partition of India, which displaced his family.

Meanwhile, during the trip itself, Shyam discovers through his servant, who had previously served under Mr. Mehra, that Savitri Devi is the lost wife of Mr. Mehra and Neena their daughter and thus true heir. He thus tries to cultivate both mother and daughter in the hope of usurping Mr. Mehra's wealth.

After several misunderstandings and an altercation with goons at the nightclub of the hotel, because of Neena, Kumar and Neena fall in love and express their desire to marry to Mr. Mehra, who disapproves.

Subsequently, Neena and her mother are given some intimate photographs of Kumar and Kamo by Kamo, alias Kamini (Mumtaz (actress)), who has been paid by Shyam to do so. But her greed makes her blackmail Shyam to give her more money to keep these secrets, whereupon he gets her killed. Kumar, to prove his innocence, barges into Kamini's room to find her dead, and is thus framed for her murder by eyewitnesses who see him there!

Savitri Devi is united with her husband, on a chance meeting, but Neena has already left with her friend Pyarelal (Rajendra Nath), who enlightens her about her true father, Shyam's bad intentions for her, and Kumar's innocence in Kamo's murder. Both of them chance to hear Shyam plotting to get Kumar shot at the beat of cymbals, to be killed during a dance performance at the International club. Pyare silences the real dancer and replaces Neena with her and thus they are able to save Kumar from an untimely ghastly death. But Shyam grabs hold of Neena and escapes in his car to his hide out. He is chased by Kumar and overpowered there, along with the timely arrival of the police, thus resulting in a happy ending of the real family uniting together.

Cast
 Biswajeet as Kumar
 Asha Parekh as Neena Mehra
 Mumtaz as Kamini 'Kammo'
 Pran as Shyam	
 Rajendra Nath as Pyarelal
 Nazir Hussain as Mr. Mehra
 Achala Sachdev as Savitri Mehra 
 Dhumal as Banke
 Asit Sen as Inspector Gopichand
 Laxmi Chhaya as Rita
 Ram Avtar as stout jeep owner at check post
 Jeevankala as lady car owner
 Dev Kishan as Lalchand, Shyam's assistant
 Maqsood as goon in Shyam's den

Soundtrack 

The soundtrack is composed by O. P. Nayyar, while the lyrics are penned by lyricist Majrooh Sultanpuri. The soundtrack consists of 9 songs. Singers such as Mohammad Rafi and Asha Bhosle have done the playback for the songs of the album. Songs such as "Pukarta Chala Hoon Main", "Jaiye Aap Kahan Jayenge" and "Yeh Hai Reshmi Zulfon Ka Andhera" are still considered to be classics, while the others songs are also popular. There is also a small alap, which Mohammed Rafi takes in the beginning of the song "Jaiye Aap Kahan Jayenge".

References

External links
 
 Mere Sanam on YouTube

1965 films
1960s Hindi-language films
Films scored by O. P. Nayyar
Indian remakes of American films